Re-recording may refer to:

 Re-recording (filmmaking), the process with which the audio track of a film or video production is created
 Re-recording (video gaming), the act of using a save state while recording a tool-assisted speedrun
 Re-recording (music), where a music artist or group re-records an already published song